Jablanica is a common South Slavic toponym, derived from jablan, "Lombardy poplar", literally meaning "place of lombardy poplar". It may refer to:

Albania 
 Jablanica Mountain, in eastern Albania and the west of the Republic of Macedonia

Bosnia and Herzegovina 
 Jablanica, Bosnia and Herzegovina, a town and municipality in Herzegovina
 Jablanica, Gradiška
 Jablanica, Lopare, a village in Republika Srpska
 Jablanica (Maglaj), a village in Maglaj municipality
 Jablanica, Tešanj
 Jablanica, Trnovo
 Jablanica (Višegrad)

Kosovo 
 Jablanica, Kosovo, a village - see List of populated places in Kosovo by municipality

Macedonia 
 Jablanica, a village in Struga Municipality
 Jablanica Mountain, in western Macedonia and the east of Albania

Montenegro 
 Jablanica, a village in Rožaje Municipality

Serbia 
 Jablanica (river), in southern Serbia 
 Jablanica (region), drainage basin of Jablanica
 Jablanica District, in southern Serbia
 Jablanica, Gornji Milanovac, settlement
 Jablanica, Boljevac, settlement
 Jablanica, Bujanovac, settlement
 Jablanica, Kruševac, settlement
 Jablanica, Novi Pazar, settlement
 Jablanica, Tutin, settlement
 Jablanica, Čajetina, settlement
 Jablanica, Prizren, settlement

Slovenia 
 Jablanica, Ilirska Bistrica, a settlement in the Municipality of Ilirska Bistrica
 Jablanica, Sevnica, a settlement in the Municipality of Sevnica
 Spodnja Jablanica, a settlement in the Municipality of Šmartno pri Litiji 
 Zgornja Jablanica, a settlement in the Municipality of Šmartno pri Litiji

See also 
 Yablanitsa, a town in Lovech Province, Bulgaria
 Jablanac, village in Croatia (same toponymic origin)